Mulben railway station served the hamlet of Mulben, Moray, Scotland from 1858 to 1964 on the Inverness and Aberdeen Junction Railway.

History 
The station opened on 18 August 1858 by the Inverness and Aberdeen Junction Railway. There were two signal boxes, one at the west end and one at the east end. To the south was the goods yard. The station closed to both passengers and goods traffic on 7 December 1964.

References

External links 

Disused railway stations in Moray
Former Highland Railway stations
Railway stations in Great Britain opened in 1858
Railway stations in Great Britain closed in 1964
Beeching closures in Scotland
1858 establishments in England
1964 disestablishments in England